Th1rt3en or TH1RT3EN may refer to:

In music 
 TH1RT3EN (Megadeth album), 2011 
 TH1RT3EN (Robert Miles album), 2011

See also
 Th1rte3n, a book by Richard Morgan (2007)
 Thirteen (disambiguation)